A Promise is the second studio album by American experimental band Xiu Xiu, released on February 18, 2003 by 5 Rue Christine.

Overview 

The track "Sad Pony Guerrilla Girl" is a reworking of a song by Jamie Stewart's previous band Ten In The Swear Jar (XITSJ), called just "Sad Girl", which first appeared on their 1999 album My Very Private Map. "Pink City" also has its roots in a two-part song from XITSJ's unreleased album Eat Death Orphans!, which was eventually published in 2003's Accordion Solo! as "Hot Karl".

The album includes a stripped-down cover of Tracy Chapman's "Fast Car", of which Stewart said "That song really, very, very, very directly shaped how I wanted to write lyrics or what I wanted songs to be about...I wanted them to turn out in so far as the song very specifically narrates some particular horrible things that happen to somebody and there's no positive resolution in the end at all."

Referring to the closing track, "Ian Curtis Wishlist", Stewart explained that "an Ian Curtis wish list is a list of things that you have convinced yourself that you want to have happen, but you know that are never going to happen."

Cover art 

The cover art shows "a nude man kneeling on a bed and holding an upside-down baby doll". The photograph was taken by Xiu Xiu frontperson Jamie Stewart, who met the photo's subject, a sex worker, at a gay cruising spot in Hanoi, Vietnam, and paid the man to take photos with the baby. The original release was printed with an orange rectangle covering the man's penis, as the distributor told the band that only a tenth of the stores would carry the album without the censor. The rectangle censor was based on Todd Solondz's Storytelling, and Stewart was fine with it since "the point of the photo was him and not his dick". The vinyl reissue went uncensored, and the label (Absolutely Kosher) threatened to take their business elsewhere if the manufacturer did not want to print the cover.

Reception 

Brandon Stosuy of Pitchfork wrote that Stewart "came into his own" on A Promise. A Promise is Canadian musician and 2006 Polaris Music Prize winner Owen Pallett's favorite album.

Track listing

Personnel

Xiu Xiu
 Jamie Stewart 
 Lauren Andrews 
 Ches Smith
 Yvonne Chen
 Tally Jones

Additional personnel
 Cory McCulloch  
 Aaron Russell
 Wei Hwu
 Sara Chaney
 Jherek Bischoff
 Korum Bischoff
 Sam Mickens
 John Golden - Mastering

References

Xiu Xiu albums
2003 albums
5 Rue Christine albums
Obscenity controversies in music